Jan Bengt Peter Karlsson (born 8 February 1966) is a Swedish former cyclist. He won the bronze medal in the team time trial road race along with Anders Jarl, Michel Lafis and Björn Johansson in the 1988 Summer Olympics. He also rode at the 1992 Summer Olympics and the 1996 Summer Olympics.

References

1966 births
Living people
Swedish male cyclists
Cyclists at the 1988 Summer Olympics
Cyclists at the 1992 Summer Olympics
Cyclists at the 1996 Summer Olympics
Olympic cyclists of Sweden
Olympic bronze medalists for Sweden
People from Falköping Municipality
Medalists at the 1988 Summer Olympics
Olympic medalists in cycling
Sportspeople from Västra Götaland County
20th-century Swedish people
21st-century Swedish people